The 1979-80 NBA season was the Bulls' 14th season in the NBA and their final season in the Western Conference.

Draft picks

Roster

Regular season

Season standings

z - clinched division title
y - clinched division title
x - clinched playoff spot

Record vs. opponents

Game log

Player statistics

Season

Awards and records
 David Greenwood, NBA All-Rookie Team 1st Team

Transactions

References

See also
 1979-80 NBA season

Chicago Bulls seasons
Chic
Chicago Bulls
Chicago Bulls